CLIST (Command List) (pronounced "C-List") is a procedural programming language for TSO in MVS systems. It originated in OS/360 Release 20 and has assumed a secondary role since the availability of Rexx in TSO/E Version 2. The term CLIST is also used for command lists written by users of NetView.

In its basic form, a CLIST program (or "CLIST" for short) can take the form of a simple list of commands to be executed in strict sequence (like a DOS batch file (*.bat) file).  However, CLIST also features If-Then-Else logic as well as loop constructs.

CLIST is an interpreted language.  That is, the computer must translate a CLIST every time the program is executed.  CLISTs therefore tend to be slower than programs written in compiled languages such as COBOL, FORTRAN, or PL/1.  (A program written in a compiled language is translated once to create a "load module" or executable.)

CLIST can read/write MVS files and read/write from/to a TSO terminal. It can read parameters from the caller and also features a function to hold global variables and pass them between CLISTs. A CLIST can also call an MVS application program (written in COBOL or  PL/I, for example). CLISTs can be run in background (by running JCL which executes the TSO control program (IKJEFT01)). TSO I/O screens and menus using ISPF dialog services can be displayed by CLISTs.

Compare the function of CLIST with that provided by REXX.

Example programs 

 PROC 0
 WRITE HELLO WORLD!

Adding If-Then-Else logic:
   /********************************************************************/
   /*  MULTI-LINGUAL "HELLO WORLD" PROGRAM.                            */
   /*                                                                  */
   /*  THIS CLIST, STORED AS USERID.TSO.CLIST(TEST), CAN BE INVOKED    */
   /*  FROM THE ISPF COMMAND LINE AS SHOWN IN THE FOLLOWING EXAMPLE:   */
   /*                                                                  */
   /*     COMMAND ===> TSO TEST SPANISH                                */
   /*                                                                  */
   /********************************************************************/
   PROC 1 LANGUAGE
     IF &LANGUAGE = SPANISH THEN +
        WRITE HOLA, MUNDO
     ELSE IF &LANGUAGE = FRENCH THEN +
        WRITE BONJOUR, MONDE
     ELSE +
        WRITE HELLO, WORLD
   EXIT

See also 

 Rexx

Footnotes

References 

IBM mainframe operating systems
Procedural programming languages
Command shells
Text-oriented programming languages
Scripting languages